Seo Taiji and Boys is the debut studio album by South Korean musical trio Seo Taiji and Boys, released via Bando Records on March 23, 1992.  Written primarily by Seo Taiji, the record incorporates and fuses various genres including new jack swing, techno, R&B and hip hop. It spawned the group's first big hit and now their signature song, "I Know" (Nan Arayo).

The album brought the group major success, which would continue through the band's next three albums and even frontman Seo Taiji's solo career. With over 1.8 million copies sold, it is one of the best-selling albums in South Korea. Seo Taiji and Boys is considered to be one of the most influential Korean albums with Pitchfork writing that it represents "the dawn of K-pop".

Background and release
The album was released on March 23, 1992, and marked the trio's debut. The album was released in a special 15th Anniversary Edition with bonus tracks in 2007, which includes live tracks and remixes, as well as the video mix of "Nan Arayo". The 2007 edition is also available internationally in digital form through venues such as Amazon and iTunes, with official English titles used by the Seotaiji Company. However, in international territories, the digital version does not include "Rock 'n Roll Dance" in either its original or remixed form, due to licensing issues with using samples from AC/DC's "Back in Black".

Reception
In April 1996, Billboard reported that the album had sold over 1.6 million copies, which has since grown to over 1.8 million copies and is one of the best-selling albums of all time in South Korea. 

The album was met with acclaim in both South Korea and abroad, with the Kyunghyang Shinmun ranking the album at number 24 on their 2007 list of the Top 100 Korean Albums. In 2020, Pitchfork rated the album 8.3 out of ten, making it the highest rated Korean album reviewed by the publication. Editor Noah Yoo stated that the album's "canny synthesis of rap, techno, and rock ... would soon be seen as the dawn of K-pop."

Accolades 
Seo Taiji and Boys won a Golden Disc Award for "I Know" in 1992. The song received 26 music program awards from June to August 1992. "You, In the Fantasy" also won 16 music program awards from September to November.

Track listing 
English titles are based on the official translations provided by the Seotaiji Company for international markets. All tracks are written by Seo Taiji, except track 5 lyrics by Yang Hyun-suk, track 8 lyrics by William B., and track 9 music by Angus Young.

Personnel
Seo Taiji − vocals, arrangement, computer programming, synthesizer, guitar on tracks 2, 3 & 8
Yang Hyun-suk − vocals
Lee Juno − vocals
Son Mu-hyeon − guitar on track 6
Shin Daechul − guitar on track 9
Kim Jong-seo − chorus
Jang Hye-jin − chorus
Lee Jung Sik − saxophone

Notes

References

External links

1992 debut albums
Seo Taiji and Boys albums